Club Deportivo Petrotela was a Honduran football team based in Tela, Atlántida.

History

Tela Timsa
They played in the top division in Honduran football for the first time in the 1985–86 season using the name of Tela Timsa. The club was relegated one year later and returned in 1990–91.

One season later Henry Arévalo, a business man, bought the club's franchise and changed its name to Petrotela, obtaining the second place that same year. However they were relegated again next season as most of their games were played at other team's soil.

Achievements
Liga Nacional
Runners-up (1): 1992–93

Segunda División
Winners (2): 1984, 1989–90
Runners-up (1): 1987–88

League performance

 From 1985–86 to 1990–91 as Tela Timsa.
 From 1991–92 to 1993–94 as Petrotela.

Coaches
  Julio Gonzalez (1992)

References

Defunct football clubs in Honduras